The Inland Sea is a 1991 American travel documentary directed by Lucille Carra. It is inspired by the 1971 travelogue of the same title written by Donald Richie. In the documentary, filmmaker Carra undertakes a similar trip across the islands of Japan's Inland Sea as Richie did twenty years prior. Donald Richie narrates the film.

The film won numerous awards, including Best Documentary at the Hawaii International Film Festival (1991) and the Earthwatch Film Award. It was screened at the Sundance Film Festival in 1992.

Production
American-born author Donald Richie primarily researched and wrote about the Japanese people and their culture. In 1971 he published The Inland Sea, a memoir of his travels across the isolated islands of the Seto Inland Sea to observe the way of life of the region's inhabitants. Twenty years later, documentary film director Lucille Carra intended to retrace his trip. The region was researched for a three-year period before filming began.

Reception

Critical reception
The film won the Best Documentary Award at the Hawaii International Film Festival and the Earthwatch Film Award. It screened at over forty film festivals, including the Sundance Film Festival. It is in the permanent film collections at the Museum of Modern Art and the UCLA/Sundance Collection.

Home media
The Inland Sea was released on Blu-ray by The Criterion Collection in 2019.

See also
 List of American films of 1991

References

External links
 
 
 
The Inland Sea: Invitation to the Voyage an essay by Arturo Silva at the Criterion Collection

English-language Japanese films
American documentary films
1991 documentary films
1991 films
Documentary films about Japan
Films about travel
1990s English-language films
1990s American films